The 1923 Missouri Tigers football team was an American football team that represented the University of Missouri in the Missouri Valley Intercollegiate Athletic Association (Missouri Valley) during the 1923 college football season. The team compiled a 2–3–3 record (1–3–2 against Missouri Valley opponents), finished in eighth place in the Missouri Valley conference, and was outscored by all opponents by a combined total of 40 to 31. Gwinn Henry was the head coach for the first of nine seasons. The team played its home games at Rollins Field in Columbia, Missouri.

Schedule

References

Missouri
Missouri Tigers football seasons
Missouri Tigers football